Kvarnsjön is a lake in Stockholm County, Södermanland, Sweden.

It is part of the Tyresån lake system.

Lakes of Stockholm County